Semel or Semels may refer to:

 David Semel, American film, television director and producer
 Harry Semels (1887–1946), American film actor
 Stephen Semel, American film editor, director and producer 
 Terry Semel (born 1943), U.S. businessman, former chairman and chief executive officer of Yahoo! Incorporated
 Semel Institute for Neuroscience and Human Behavior, University of California, Los Angeles
 Semel District, Duhok Governorate, Iraqi Kurdistan region

See also
 Simele (or Sumail), a town in the Kurdistan Region of Iraq